is a Japanese group rhythmic gymnast. She is the 2019 World  Group All-around silver and the 2017 World  Group All-around bronze medalist.

Personal life
She is studying at Nippon Sport Science University in Setagaya, Japan.

Career
She joined Japanese National group in 2017 and took bronze medal in Group All-around at the 2017 World Championships in Pesaro, Italy together with Mao Kunii, Rie Matsubara, Sayuri Sugimoto, Nanami Takenaka and Kiko Yokota. They also won silver medal in 3 Ropes + 2 Balls final, next day. In 2018, they placed 5th in Group All-around at the 2018 World Championships in Sofia, Bulgaria and took silver medal in 5 Hoops Final.

On September 16–22, she and her teammates competed at the 2019 World Championships, her third. They won silver medal in Group All-around and 3 Hoops + 4 Clubs Final and won gold in 5 Balls Final. This was Japanese first ever gold medal in group event at World Championships.

References

External links
 
 
 
 

1999 births
Living people
Japanese rhythmic gymnasts
Place of birth missing (living people)
Medalists at the Rhythmic Gymnastics World Championships
Gymnasts at the 2020 Summer Olympics
Olympic gymnasts of Japan
21st-century Japanese women